Dunfermline West was a constituency of the Scottish Parliament (Holyrood). It elected one Member of the Scottish Parliament (MSP) by the plurality (first past the post) method of election. 
From the 2011 Scottish Parliament election, parts of the Dunfermline East constituency were merged with Dunfermline West to form a single Dunfermline constituency.

Electoral region 

The region covers all of the Clackmannanshire council area, all of the Fife council area, all of the Perth and Kinross council area, all of the Stirling council area and parts of the Angus council area.

Constituency boundaries and council area 

The  constituency was created at the same time as the Scottish Parliament, in 1999, with the name and boundaries of a pre-existing Westminster (House of Commons) constituency. In 2005, however, Scottish Westminster constituencies were mostly replaced with new constituencies. The Dunfermline West Westminster constituency was merged into Dunfermline and West Fife.

The Holyrood constituency of Dunfermline West was one of five Mid Scotland and Fife constituencies covering the Fife council area, the others being Dunfermline East, Fife Central, Fife North East and Kirkcaldy. All were entirely within the council area.

Dunfermline West covered a south-western portion of the council area, west of Dunfermline East.

Description of the constituency 

The constituency included all of the town of Dunfermline and some land on the north bank of the Firth of Forth.

Historically, the town was once Scotland's capital city. Eight kings are buried there, amongst them Robert the Bruce. Today, textiles, engineering and synthetic material manufacturing are the primary industries. The constituency also contains rural areas.

Like its neighbour, Dunfermline East, the constituency was one of Labour’s safest seats in Scotland. In Westminster elections voters in the area elected Labour Members of Parliament (MPs) continuously from 1935 until 2006. In a 2006 by-election, however, the Liberal Democrats won the equivalent Westminster seat, and they proceeded to win the Holyrood seat in 2007 as well, calling into question Labour's future as a dominant party in the area.

Member of the Scottish Parliament

Election results

Footnotes 

Scottish Parliament constituencies and regions 1999–2011
1999 establishments in Scotland
Constituencies established in 1999
2011 disestablishments in Scotland
Constituencies disestablished in 2011
Politics of Fife
Politics of Dunfermline
Culross
Kincardine, Fife
Blairhall